Opaka Municipality is a municipality in the Targovishte Province of Bulgaria.

Demography

At the 2011 census, the population of Opaka was 6,664. Most of the inhabitants were Turks (57.89%), with a minority of Bulgarians (21.5%). 20.46% of the population's ethnicity was unknown.

Villages
In addition to the capital town of Opaka, there are 5 villages in the municipality:
 Goliamo Gradishte
 Gorsko Ablanovo
 Garchinovo
 Krepcha
 Liublen

References

Municipalities in Targovishte Province